The Ponte de Rubiães is a Roman bridge in the civil parish of Rubiães, Paredes de Coura municipality, northern Portugal. It crosses the small river Coura. It is part of the Portuguese Way of St. James. The bridge was constructed in the 2nd century.

Footnotes

See also 
 List of Roman bridges
 List of bridges in Portugal

External links 
 Traianus - Technical investigation of Roman public works

Roman bridges in Portugal
Bridges completed in the 2nd century
Paredes de Coura
Bridges in Viana do Castelo District
Listed bridges in Portugal